Faver is a surname. Notable people with the surname include:

Colin Faver (1951–2015), British club and radio DJ
Dudley E. Faver (1916–2011), United States Air Force general
Héctor Fáver (born 1960), Argentine film producer and director
Milton Faver ( 1822–1889), American cattle rancher

See also
Haver